William or Bill Watkins may refer to:

People

Politics 
 William H. Watkins (politician) (1827–1888), an elected delegate to the Oregon Constitutional Convention
 William Henry Watkins (1862–1924), British co-operative activist
 William J. Watkins, Sr. (1803-1858), Black abolitionist and educator
 William Keith Watkins (born 1951), U.S. federal judge
 William Wirt Watkins (1826–1898), Arkansas politician

Sports
 Bill Watkins (baseball) (1858–1937), Canadian baseball manager
 Walter H. Watkins, head coach of the Auburn college football program, 1900–1901
 William Richard Watkins (1904–1986), English cricketer
 Billy Watkins (rugby) (c. 1910–1972), rugby union and rugby league footballer of the 1930s
 William Watkins (footballer), English footballer who played for Burnley between 1898 and 1902
 Bill Watkins (cricketer, born 1923) (1923–2005), Welsh cricketer

Other people
 Billy Watkins (musician)
 William Watkins (cleric), Welsh cleric
 Bill Watkins (Seagate) (born c. 1953), CEO of Seagate Technology
 William John Watkins (born 1942), American science fiction writer and poet
 William Turner Watkins (1895–1961), American Methodist bishop
 William Watkins (entomologist) (1849–1900), English entomologist
 William Watkins (architect) (1834–1926), English architect

Other uses 
 William Watkins Ltd, a tugboat owning company

See also
William Watkin (disambiguation)

Watkins, William